Blackout in the Red Room is the debut studio album by the American hard rock band Love/Hate. It was released on February 22, 1990, on Columbia Records. It reached #154 on the Billboard 200 album chart. The video for the single "Why Do You Think They Call It Dope?" received good rotation on MTV, chiefly on Headbangers Ball.

Lead singer Jizzy Pearl has enjoyed a resurgence of popularity over recent years and continues to tour to good reviews. New material is believed to be in the pipeline for 2021/22 with a tour of the US and UK to support it.

Track listing

Personnel 
Jizzy Pearl – vocals
Jon E. Love – guitar
Skid (Rose) – bass, rhythm guitar on "Slave Girl", 12-string guitar on "She's an Angel"
Joey Gold – drums

Additional musicians
Greg Gottlieb – cellos on "Why Do You Think They Call It Dope?" and "Mary Jane"
 Paul Lewolt – bagpipes on "Why Do You Think They Call It Dope?"
 David Kahne – cellos on "She's an Angel"

References 

Love/Hate (band) albums
1990 debut albums
Albums produced by David Kahne
Albums produced by Tom Werman
Columbia Records albums